Lyreco is a worldwide distributor of office supplies and workplace services, founded in 1926 by Georges-Gaston Gaspard in the Valenciennes area of France.

The company focused its development on the French territory during the 1970s. In 1989, Lyreco Group acquired its first company outside France, and the Group is now active in 25 countries in Europe and Asia and covers 16 additional markets on 4 continents through a network of distribution partners and employs 12,000 people.

In December 2018, Lyreco diversified. The family Group acquires two companies from the Dutch Broadview Holding: Intersafe, in the Netherlands, and Elacin. Both specialize in personal protective equipment (PPE), from goggles to gas detectors to custom earplugs.

The current slogan of Lyreco is "A Great Working Day. Delivered."

Re-branding
Starting in 2009, Lyreco's own brand products, formerly identified as Impega, were re-branded simply to Lyreco, with the budget, standard and premium ranges remaining unaffected.

Since 2017, the Lyreco social media program has been launched with big plans for the Telford office to construct a contemplation room and other "quirky" office features .

Lyreco for Education
Started in 2008, the Lyreco for Education Program raises funds from the 16 subsidiaries of the group to give children living in poor conditions a better access to education.

From 2019 to 2022, this initiative will support a project in Cambodia. LFE will unite its efforts to collect money to provide a good start in the lives of 11,000 children by rebuilding and renovating school facilities, improving quality of education and learning conditions, in particular for ethnic minorities.

Products
 Office, furniture and technology (including paper, filing and presentation, stationery, writing Tools, books and pads, labels and signage)
 Cleaning, hygiene and catering products
 Personalized products (including PPE and print)
 PPE, safety and packaging

References

External links

 Lyreco Official Website
 Lyreco YouTube Page

British Royal Warrant holders
Business services companies established in 1926
Service companies of France
Office supply companies of France
French brands
1926 establishments in France